Boreus hyemalis is an insect, 3 to 4.5 millimetres long from the family of Boreidae. Its common name is snow flea.

It has stubby, grey-brown wings with a metallic sheen. Snow fleas crawl or hop over the snow at temperatures around freezing point and thus resemble glacier fleas and snow flies.

The males have 4 short, wing vestiges which curve downwards at their ends. The females only have two scale-like wing vestiges. In general, the female may be recognised from a curved, sabre-like pipe that acts as an ovipositor. In their fully formed state, these animals are only found in the colder period of the year between October and March. During this time mating takes place. The larvae live on moss-covered areas and withdraw in September into holes in the group to pupate.

Sources 

 Alfred Edmund Brehm: Däggdjurens Lif. Em. Girons, Stockholm 1882, pp. 145f. (Swedish) (online at: runeberg.org)
 Döderlein: Bestimmungsbuch für deutsche Land- und Süsswassertiere/ Insekten. Part I: Käfer, Wespen, Libellen, Heuschrecken usw. Oldenbourg, Munich, 1932, DNB 365535060, p. 78.

Boreus
Insects described in 1767
Taxa named by Carl Linnaeus